Gary Earl Coons (born August 13, 1951) was the Member of the Legislative Assembly (MLA) for the North Coast riding of British Columbia, Canada from 2005 to 2013.
Coons is a former math teacher, having worked in the Prince Rupert area for 25 years.  He was a teacher at Charles Hays Secondary School.  He was also more recently the president of the Prince Rupert District Teachers Union, a local of the British Columbia Teachers' Federation.

Education
Coons was born in Winnipeg, Manitoba. Soon after he was born his family moved to Lachine, Quebec, which was, at that time, a city outside of Montreal.
In 1967, he moved to Burlington, Ontario where he began his lifelong love affair with hockey, playing junior "B" with the Burlington Mohawks. He graduated from Nelson High School which he attended from grades 11 to 13. After graduating, Coons attended the University of Western Ontario in London, Ontario where he received his BA in Mathematics and his Bachelor of Education, with specializations in Math and Physical Education. Throughout his school years, Coons continued playing hockey, playing junior "A" hockey with the St.Thomas Elgins from 1970-71 before moving up to the Mustangs university team.  While playing on University of Western Ontario hockey team, Coons claimed a university league record for penalty minutes.

Career
In 1976, after completing his education, Coons moved to Prince George where he worked for a juvenile detention center with kids in need. Coons left Prince George when he was hired as a special education teacher at Prince Rupert's Booth Memorial Junior Secondary school in 1977. He worked as a teacher for three years before he resigned, in 1980, to co-ordinate the 1981 Northern BC Winter Games, which were held in Prince Rupert. Once the games were completed, Coons tried his hand in the commercial fishing industry, working on a gill-netter for a short time.

In 1981, Coons married Lois Elliot, another teacher in Prince Rupert. She currently teaches at Pineridge school. Together, they have two children, Hannah and Breton. In 1982, Coons returned to teaching at Booth Memorial Junior Secondary, this time as a math teacher. In 1986, Coons became the head instructor at Kaien Alternate school, this continued until 1992, when he went on a teaching exchange to Australia. After his exchange to Australia, Coons was back in Prince Rupert, teaching, this time at Charles Hays Secondary School. He taught the subjects of math and physical education.  His love of sports led Coons to coach recreational activities on a community level, including baseball, soccer and hockey.

Throughout this time, Coons was active in the British Columbia Teachers' Federation. His commitment to social justice and activism led him to sit on committees and to participate in many roles in the BCTF from 1983–2005. His first experience with a major political movement was in 1983, when the Solidarity Coalition rallied against twenty-seven Bills the provincial legislature had introduced. Coons joined more than 50,000 unionists and other demonstrators in protesting the Bills, which attacked human rights, labour, education, and social programs in British Columbia.

Coons served as president of the Prince Rupert District Teachers' Union from 2001–2004. During his time as president of the union, Coons participated in political actions; this led him to put his name forward as a nominee for the NDP for the 2005 election. He won the nomination, and, eventually, the seat.

References

External links
Gary Coons's official website
Gary's NDP Caucus page
Gary's Flickr picture page

1951 births
British Columbia New Democratic Party MLAs
Canadian schoolteachers
Living people
People from Prince Rupert, British Columbia
Politicians from Winnipeg
University of Western Ontario alumni
21st-century Canadian politicians